Valhalla is a 2019 Danish dark fantasy adventure film, directed by Fenar Ahmad, and based on the comic book of the same name ("Cry Wolf") by Peter Madsen, Hans Rancke-Madsen and Henning Kure.

The film was released on 10 October 2019, the same date as the original 1986 film.

Summary
The Viking children Røskva and Tjalfe embark on an adventurous journey from Midgard to Valhalla with the gods Thor and Loki. Life in Valhalla, however, turns out to be threatened by the dreaded Fenrir wolf and the god's barbaric archenemies, the Jotnar. Side by side with the gods the two children must fight to save Valhalla from the end of the world - Ragnarok.

Cast
 Cecilia Loffredo as Røskva
 Saxo Molthke-Leth as Tjalfe
 Roland Møller as Thor
  as Loki
 Reza Forghani as Quark
 Stine Fischer Christensen as Frigg
  as Týr
 Asbjørn Krogh Nissen as Odin
 Ali Sivandi as Skrymer
 Uffe Lorentzen as Útgarða-Loki
  as Baldr
 Salóme R. Gunnarsdóttir as Freyja
 Lára Jóhanna Jónsdóttir as Sif
 Sanne Salomonsen as Elli
 Emma Rosenzweig as Jættedronningen
 Patricia Schumann as Mother
  as Father

Reception
The film was nominated for the Robert Award for Best Children's Film.

References

External links

2019 films
Films based on Norse mythology
Films based on Danish comics
Live-action films based on comics
Films about Thor
Films shot in Iceland
2010s Danish-language films